The Unseen Empire is the fifth full-length studio album by Swedish metal band Scar Symmetry. It was released on 15 April 2011 in Europe, and on 17 May 2011 in North America. The album sold around 1,500 copies in the United States in its first week of release, and landed at position number 11 on the Top New Artist Albums (Heatseekers) chart. This is the last album to feature contributions from guitarist Jonas Kjellgren, who left the band in 2013 due to other commitments.

Drummer Henrik Ohlsson said that the album "seeks to expose the hidden hand of the elite that pull the strings of mankind in order to fulfill their agenda of global domination."

Track listing

Personnel
Roberth Karlsson – lead growl vocals, backing clean vocals
Lars Palmqvist – lead clean vocals, backing growl vocals
Per Nilsson – lead guitar, rhythm guitar, keyboards
Jonas Kjellgren – rhythm guitar, lead guitar, keyboards
Kenneth Seil – bass
Henrik Ohlsson – drums

Release history

References

2011 albums
Scar Symmetry albums
Nuclear Blast albums